The ninth season of the Australian version of the original NBC reality television series The Biggest Loser, known as The Biggest Loser Australia: Challenge Australia, premiered on 19 January 2014 on Network Ten. This season saw the trainers head to Ararat, Victoria, which at the time of filming was Victoria's fattest town in order to change the lifestyles of its residents before bringing a select few residents back to the Biggest Loser House to compete for the title and prize money. Season 9 was won by Craig Booby.

Host and personalities
Host: Hayley Lewis has returned for her fifth season as host. She will surpass original host Ajay Rochester to become the show's longest serving host.

Trainers: Shannan Ponton, Michelle Bridges and Steve Willis (The Commando)

Weigh-Ins

Notes

Standings
 Week's Biggest Loser
 Immunity
 Immunity & Biggest Loser
 Under Yellow Line
 In Competition
 Eliminated Contestant Weigh-In
 Automatic Elimination
 Left before weigh-in (Choice, Challenge, The Fridge or Expulsion)
 Won Weigh-in pass based on Weigh-in or competition (for previously eliminated contestants)
 (Last person eliminated before finale)
 Winner (among finalist)
 Winner (among eliminated)
 Contestant returned to the competition

Teams
 Commando's Team
 Shannan's Team
 Michelle's Team

References

External links
Contestant Bios
Big Kev's Blogs

Australia: Challenge Australia
2014 Australian television seasons
Obesity